Georg Krogmann (4 September 1886 in Kiel – 9 January 1915) was a German amateur footballer who played as a midfielder and competed in the 1912 Summer Olympics. He was a member of the German Olympic squad and played one match in the main tournament as well as one match in the consolation tournament. All in all he scored 3 Caps.

He died during World War I.

See also
 List of Olympians killed in World War I

References

External links

1886 births
1915 deaths
German footballers
Germany international footballers
Olympic footballers of Germany
Footballers at the 1912 Summer Olympics
Holstein Kiel players
German military personnel killed in World War I
German footballers needing infoboxes
Association football midfielders
Sportspeople from Kiel